Dioptis vacuata is a moth of the family Notodontidae first described by William Warren in 1905. It is found in Panama.

It is the largest member of the genus Dioptis, with females reaching a forewing length of 25 mm.

References

Moths described in 1905
Notodontidae